Kim Mi-soo (March 16, 1992 – January 5, 2022) was a South Korean actress and model.

Career
Kim began her debut in 2018 in Lipstick Revolution. During the early stages of her career, Kim was known for her debut role from Lipstick Revolution and a supporting character from Kyungmi's World. She also appeared in the 2020 drama Hi Bye, Mama! as the female protagonist's sister.

Kim recently gained attention for her portrayal of a cold but kind and righteous student activist Yeo Jeong-min in JTBC's Snowdrop (2021-22). Despite the show's controversies relating to alleged historical distortion, Kim's appearance in Snowdrop was her most notable on-screen performance to date; however, it became her second-last on-screen role as Kim died on 5 January 2022. Prior to Kim's death, seven out of 16 episodes had been broadcast, and the filming had concluded since Snowdrop was a pre-produced series.

Kim was cast in an undisclosed role in Disney+'s original drama Kiss Six Sense, which was set to air in the first half of 2022, and it has started filming. Kiss Six Sense canceled the scheduled filming for the day due to the sudden death of Kim Mi-soo. The filming resumed the following day after they paused filming, but there was no confirmation on whether Kim's character would be recast, or Kim's scenes were completed; Kim's character was as an assistant manager for the advertising firm portrayed on the series.

Death

On January 5, 2022, Kim died due to unspecified causes at age 29.  Her funeral was held privately  in Seoul two days after she died. Kim's fans and her fellow cast members from Snowdrop, including Blackpink's Jisoo and Jung Hae-in, paid tributes to her on social media.
Her cause of death has not been made public, and her agency stated in a press release, "We sincerely ask you to refrain from making up rumors or speculative reports so that the bereaved family, who are in shock and grief-stricken, can reverently commemorate the deceased."

Filmography

Film

Television series

Web series

References

External links 
 
 

1992 births
2022 deaths
21st-century South Korean actresses
South Korean female models
South Korean film actresses
South Korean television actresses
South Korean web series actresses
Korea National University of Arts alumni